Joshua Isaih "OG" Parker (born October 27, 1993), is an American record producer from Atlanta. He is currently signed to Quality Control Music and has been with the label since 2014. OG Parker has produced for artists including Migos, Chris Brown, Tory Lanez, Fetty Wap, K Camp, YFN Lucci and Kollision.

Early life and career 
Parker was born and raised in Fayetteville, Georgia. He has been musically inclined since his childhood. At age 10, he learned how to play piano, saxophone, clarinet and percussion.

He attended Georgia State University from 2012 to 2014 and studied music and graphic arts. While in school he began creating remixes of popular songs and producing beats using FL Studio 11 and Komplete Control s61. In 2015, Parker left Georgia State and decided to pursue music professionally. He joined OG Maco's collective OGG: this is where he received his stage name.

Parker has produced for artists including Chris Brown, Migos, Katy Perry, DJ Carnage, Lil Yachty, and more. In 2016, he produced seven tracks on YFN Lucci's critically acclaimed project Wish Me Well 2.

In 2015, he launched his company, Neutral, which consists of a music production group and a lifestyle brand. Neutral's production group is made up of OG Parker, Goldenchlyd, Romano, Beezo Beatz, S0ulful Music, Joey Dzo, Melo D, and DregotJuice. The lifestyle brand is run by OG Parker and Rashid Nellons.

Artistry 
With his use of ambient melodies, intricate drum patterns, and heavy bass lines, Parker’s has described his production style as trap and R&B.

Production discography

Charted songs

Production credits

References

Living people
1993 births
African-American record producers
African-American songwriters
Songwriters from Georgia (U.S. state)
American hip hop record producers
Musicians from Atlanta
Southern hip hop musicians
21st-century African-American people